The NHS Counter Fraud Authority is a  special health authority charged with identifying, investigating and preventing fraud and other economic crime within the NHS and the wider health group, formed on November 1, 2017 under section 28 of the National Health Service Act 2006.  It replaces its predecessor NHS Protect, which was part of the NHS Business Services Authority.

Role 
As a special health authority focused entirely on counter-fraud work, the Counter Fraud Authority is independent from other NHS bodies and as an arm's length body is directly accountable to the Department of Health and Social Care.

The departmental sponsor is the Department of Health and Social Care's Anti-Fraud Unit, which holds the board to account for the delivery of its strategy.

The mission of the organisation is to lead the fight against fraud affecting the NHS and wider health service, and protect vital resources intended for patient care.  It is intended to be the single expert, intelligence-led organisation providing centralised intelligence, investigation and solutions capacity for tackling fraud in the NHS in England. It acts as the repository for all information related to fraud in the NHS and the wider health group, and will have oversight of and monitor counter fraud work across the NHS.

It calculates that £216 million in fraud was “almost certain” and a further £135 million was “highly likely” with around £560 million considered likely. This included £100 million of pharmaceutical contract fraud, £90.6 million payroll and identity fraud and £165 million related to procurement and commissioning.

Objectives 
It had five objectives for 2017–2020:
 Deliver the Department of Health's strategy, vision and strategic plan and lead counter fraud activity in the NHS in England.
 Be the single expert intelligence-led organisation providing a centralised investigation capacity for complex economic crime matters in the NHS.
 Lead and influence the improvement of standards in counter fraud work across the NHS.
 Take the lead in and encourage fraud reporting across the NHS and wider health group.
 Continue to develop the expertise of staff.
It aims to identify current and future fraud risks and adapt to emerging threats and issues, meeting head-on the fraud risks affecting the NHS and wider health group.

Location 
The organisation's headquarters is at Skipton House, London, with additional offices at Citygate in Newcastle upon Tyne and Cheylesmore House in Coventry.

See also 
 NHS Counter Fraud and Security Management Service Division

References

External links 
 https://cfa.nhs.uk/

Fraud in the United Kingdom
Fraud organizations
Health in the London Borough of Southwark
NHS special health authorities
Organisations based in the London Borough of Southwark
2017 establishments in the United Kingdom
Government agencies established in 2017